Alexandre Bolduc (born June 26, 1985) is a Canadian professional ice hockey centre who most recently played for Rivière-du-Loup 3L in the LNAH. Bolduc previously iced for Nottingham Panthers in the Elite Ice Hockey League (EIHL).

Playing career

Bolduc played major junior in the Quebec Major Junior Hockey League (QMJHL) for four seasons with the Rouyn-Noranda Huskies and Shawinigan Cataractes. After his second season in the QMJHL, a 14-goal, 43-point campaign with the Huskies, he was selected in the fourth round, 127th overall, by the St. Louis Blues in the 2003 NHL Entry Draft. However, at the end of his junior career, he was a free agent and signed with the Bakersfield Condors of the ECHL.

During his first season with the Condors, he moved up to the AHL with the Manitoba Moose. In 2007–08, Bolduc recorded a strong 37-point campaign with the Moose and was signed by the Moose's NHL affiliate, the Vancouver Canucks on July 9, 2008.

Continuing to play for the Moose as part of the Canucks' farm system in 2008–09 season, Bolduc was called up by the Canucks on November 25, 2008, to replace an injured Ryan Johnson and played his first NHL game on November 27 against the Calgary Flames. He scored his first career NHL goal against Craig Anderson of the Colorado Avalanche on January 2, 2011.

On July 2, 2011, Bolduc left Vancouver, signing a one-year, two-way contract with the Phoenix Coyotes.

On July 5, 2013 Bolduc left the Coyotes after recording no points with the club in two years. He signed a one-year contract with the St. Louis Blues worth $550,000. In the following 2013–14 season, he was assigned to their AHL affiliate, the Chicago Wolves, for the duration of the season scoring 37 points in 59 games.

On July 1, 2014, Bolduc agreed to return to the Coyotes organization, signing a one-year, two way contract with Arizona. In the 2014–15 season, Bolduc appeared in three games with the Coyotes. He primarily spent the duration of the year in second stint as captain of the Portland Pirates, contributing with 52 points in 62 games.

Bolduc left the NHL as an impending free agent on June 3, 2015, after signing a one-year contract with Russian club, Traktor Chelyabinsk of the KHL. Bolduc struggled to cement a role in Traktor and after a stint with VHL affiliate, Chelmet Chelyabinsk, he was traded to Croatian KHL participant, KHL Medveščak Zagreb, on October 21, 2015. He left Zagreb on February 1, 2017 and signed with Kölner Haie of the German DEL.

After a season with the Nottingham Panthers, Bolduc signed for Rivière-du-Loup 3L in 2019.

Career statistics

Regular season and playoffs

International

References

External links

1985 births
Living people
Arizona Coyotes players
Bakersfield Condors (1998–2015) players
Canadian ice hockey centres
Chicago Wolves players
Ice hockey people from Montreal
KHL Medveščak Zagreb players
Kölner Haie players
Manitoba Moose players
Phoenix Coyotes players
Portland Pirates players
Nottingham Panthers players
Rouyn-Noranda Huskies players
St. Louis Blues draft picks
Shawinigan Cataractes players
Traktor Chelyabinsk players
Vancouver Canucks players
Canadian expatriate ice hockey players in Croatia
Canadian expatriate ice hockey players in Germany
Canadian expatriate ice hockey players in Russia